Rajasthali is an upazila of Rangamati District in the Division of Chittagong, Bangladesh.

Geography
It has 3353 households and total area 145.04 km2.

Demographics
As of the 1991 Bangladesh census, Rajasthali has a population of 17198. Males constitute 53.84% of the population, and females 46.16%. This Upazila's eighteen up population is 9278. Rajasthali has an average literacy rate of 25.7% (7+ years), and the national average of 32.4% literate.

Administration
Rajasthali Upazila is divided into three union parishads: Bangalhalia, Gaindya, and Ghilachari. The union parishads are subdivided into 9 mauzas and 106 villages.

See also
 Upazilas of Bangladesh
 Districts of Bangladesh
 Divisions of Bangladesh

References

Upazilas of Rangamati Hill District